Paul Joseph (P. J.) Castellaneta (born 1960) is an American film director, who wrote and directed the films Together Alone and Relax...It's Just Sex.

Castellaneta was born in Lynbrook, New York. He was working as a story supervisor for Warner Bros. when he made Relax...It's Just Sex.

Castellaneta made the short film What's a Nice Kid Like You... in 1986. His feature film debut, Together Alone, won the Teddy Award and the International Confederation of Art Cinemas prize at the 42nd Berlin International Film Festival, as well as the Audience Award at the San Francisco International Lesbian & Gay Film Festival and the Best Feature Film Award at the Torino International Lesbian & Gay Film Festival. A stage adaptation of the film was also produced in 1992 by the Upstart Theatre Company in Chicago.

References

External links

1960 births
American film directors
American male screenwriters
American LGBT screenwriters
LGBT film directors
American gay writers
Living people
People from Lynbrook, New York
Screenwriters from New York (state)